House of Errors is a 1942 American comedy film directed by Bernard B. Ray and written by Ewart Adamson and Eddie Davis. The film stars Harry Langdon, Charley Rogers, Marian Marsh, Ray Walker, Betty Blythe and John Holland. The film was released on April 10, 1942, by Producers Releasing Corporation.

Plot

Cast      
Harry Langdon as Bert
Charley Rogers as Alf 
Marian Marsh as Florence Randall
Ray Walker as Jerry Fitzgerald
Betty Blythe as Mrs. Martha Randall
John Holland as Paul Gordon
Guy Kingsford as Drake
Roy Butler as Mr. Carr
Gwen Gaze as Molly
Monte Collins as Prof. Stark
Vernon Dent as White
Robert Barron as Samson
Lynn Starr as Waitress
Richard Kipling as Hiram Randall
Frank Hagney as Black

References

External links
 

1942 films
American comedy films
1942 comedy films
Producers Releasing Corporation films
Films directed by Bernard B. Ray
American black-and-white films
1940s English-language films
1940s American films